Metalworks Studios is a music recording studio in Mississauga, Ontario, Canada. It was established in 1978 by Gil Moore of the Canadian rock group, Triumph. Over a span of 40 years, Metalworks has been the recipient of Canadian Music Week's 'Studio of the Year' 17 times. Since 1978, Metalworks Studios has expanded into a six studio facility offering in-house tracking, mixing and mastering, as well as video editing and DVD authoring.

In 2004, Metalworks Studios launched an adjacent educational facility; Metalworks Institute.

Metalworks Studios has won 17 'Studio of the Year' awards at Canadian Music Week from 1998 to 2015.

Recording Studios

Metalworks has a total of six studios, including four with live rooms for in-house recording and mixing, a mastering suite, and a sixth facility dedicated to video editing.

Studio 1: Record/Mix Neve

The control room in Studio 1 features a vintage 32x8x32 Neve 8036 console that was re-engineered by Stuart Taylor and Dave Dickson. The tracking room features a  solid maple studio floor, combined with a high ceiling surrounded by wood and stone walls.

Studio 2: Record/Mix SSL G+

The control room in Studio 2 features an 80-input Solid State Logic 4080 G+ console with Ultimation and Total Recall. The adjacent  tracking room features an oak floor and high ceiling. Studio 2 also includes a private lounge.

Studio 3: Record/Mix SSL 4040
The control room in Studio 3 features the Solid State Logic 4040 G/E console. The adjoining ISO-Booth is designed for instrumental overdubs as well as voice work, and the studio includes a modern lounge featuring a skylight.

Studio 4: Video/DVD/Blu-ray
Studio 4 is a video editing and DVD/Blu-ray authoring facility specializing in visual production, motion and still menu design, interactive features, post-production, audio/video encoding, and authoring.

Studio 5: Mastering
Studio 5 is a mastering suite featuring: Steinberg WaveLab, Pro Tools HD3, Manley, Avalon, Apogee, Studer A820 1/2" Tape Machine, Weiss, TC System 6000, Waves, Mark Levinson, Duntech, and more.  Online mastering services are also provided by this facility.

Studio 6: Record/Mix 5.1 SSL J
The control room in Studio 6 features an 80 input Solid State Logic 9080 J console with Ultimation, Total Recall & SL959 5.1 Surround Matrix. This large-scale mixing facility is capable of recording and mixing in 5.1 with a Pro Tools 10 HD3 accel system. A 9 ft film screen and Sony video monitors are available for DVD and Film/TV applications, and the room is Dolby authorized. The adjacent  tracking room features a stone fireplace and high ceiling, and is surrounded by an oak paneled private lounge and billiard area.

Services
The recording studios at Metalworks provide tracking, mixing, digital editing, audio post-production, and CD mastering capabilities. Video editing and DVD/Blu-ray authoring services are also made available by a dedicated video editing facility in Studio 4. Metalworks Production Group, a sister company of Metalworks Studios, also provides in-house event options within several of the studios allowing for video, lighting, and staging system services for live events and recordings.

Clients

Music Artists

Christina Aguilera
Mohsen Chavoshi
SOCAN
Doug and the Slugs
Alexisonfire
Kobra and the Lotus
The Bachman-Cummings Band
Barenaked Ladies
Brymo
Drake
John River
David Bowie
Dolores O'Riordan
The Cranberries
Tom Cochrane
Burton Cummings
D12
DMX
Fair to Midland
Fates Warning
Nelly Furtado
Guns N' Roses
K-OS
Katy Perry
Lights
Demi Lovato
Kim Mitchell
Moneen
Anne Murray
Negramaro
The Next Star
'N Sync
Our Lady Peace
Placebo
Platinum Blonde
Prince
Protest The Hero
Rush
Sandbox
Serial Joe
Silverstein
Sisqó
Ashlee Simpson
Starchild
Sum 41
Swami
The Tea Party
Tina Turner
Triumph
Toto
David Usher
Kate Voegele
Voivod
Chance the Rapper

Film Stars
Catherine Zeta-Jones
Renée Zellweger
Steven Seagal
Richard Gere
Denise Richards

Awards 
2014 Canadian Music Week Recording Studio of The Year
2013 SME Excellence Award – Ontario Business Achievement Awards (OBAA)
2013 Canadian Music Week Recording Studio of The Year
2012 Canadian Music Week Recording Studio of The Year
2011 Canadian Music Week Recording Studio of The Year
2009 Canadian Music Week Recording Studio of The Year
2008 Canadian Music Week Recording Studio of The Year
2007 Canadian Music Week Recording Studio of The Year
2006 Canadian Music Week Recording Studio of The Year
2005 Canadian Music Week Recording Studio of The Year
2004 Canadian Music Week Recording Studio of The Year
2003 Canadian Music Week Recording Studio of The Year
2002 Mississauga Board of Trade, Business and the Arts Award in recognition of ‘Outstanding Contribution to the Arts Community of Mississauga’ 
2002 Canadian Music Week Recording Studio of The Year
2001 Canadian Music Week Recording Studio of The Year
2000 Canadian Music Week Recording Studio of The Year
1999 Canadian Music Week Recording Studio of The Year
1998 Canadian Music Week Recording Studio of The Year

Gold and platinum awards

Metalworks Institute
Metalworks Institute is a registered private career college and the sister company of Metalworks Studios and Metalworks Production Group. Metalworks Institute offers diploma programs in: Audio Production and Engineering, Entertainment Business Management, Show Production and Event Management and Music Performance and Technology (Drums & Percussion, Bass Guitar, Guitar, Keyboard and Vocals.

Metalworks Institute is an official Digidesign pro school.

References

External links

Recording studios in Canada
Mass media companies established in 1978
1978 establishments in Ontario